VariFlight Technology Co. Ltd. branded as VariFlight internationally, and as 飞常准 in Mainland China is an information technology company founded in 2005, specializing in the civil aviation data services. The company is based in Hefei, Anhui Province, People’s Republic of China.
VariFlight’s products and services include flight status information, A-CDM, mobile applications, travel information, flight delay insurance, airport taxi, etc. In 2018, VariFlight launched its online flight tracking service.

History
VariFlight was founded as Feeyo Technology Co. Ltd. in 2005 in Hefei, Anhui, China by its CEO, Hongfeng Zheng. Initially, the company was providing flight information services to other businesses in China. In 2009, the company achieved 100% coverage of China’s domestic flights. It also released the first version of VariFlight mobile application, and has been working on international flights since 2010, and covered over 94% of global commercial flight data. The company officially launched its first mobile application for flight tracking for individual users in 2011. VariFlight started to cooperate with China’s domestic airports on hubs' operation efficiency and punctuality improvement in 2014.

In 2017, VariFlight launched strategic cooperation with ICAO. Both parties collaborated on organizing the First Asia Pacific Ministerial Conference on Civil Aviation, 2018.
 
On 23 August 2019, VariFlight launched Airsavvi, a new brand dedicated to its travel data business for corporate clients.

Data sources
The company uses the following sources to obtain flight status data and related information:
 Air Traffic Control
 Airlines
 Airports
 ADS-B.

Products and services

Flight status 
VariFlight provides flight status information to businesses and individual customers.
In 2018, VariFlight reached over 99% of flights in China and 94% of global flights coverage.

Historical reports and predictive analyses
Historical reports on such parameters as flight on-time performance, airport punctuality, aerobridge utilization, flight delay time. The company has also been serving as an information source of extreme weather conditions affecting flights and airports punctuality.

Mobile applications
 Feichangzhun/VariFlight
 VariFlightPro

A-CDM
VariFlight A-CDM (Airport Collaborative Decision Making) is an information system dedicated to the improvement of airport ground operations, safety and the growth of a hub’s overall punctuality.
Data sources: ADS-B, electronic blocks, apron vehicle positioning and video analysis.
In the end of 2017, 81 airports located in Mainland China and outside have installed VariFlight’s A-CDM. Among those airports are: Kunming Changshui International Airport, Guiyang Longdongbao International Airport, Shanghai Pudong International Airport, etc.

Shanghai Pudong International Airport has been using A-CDM developed by VariFlight since January 2017. The system is aimed to improve on-time performance and safety of the airport's operations. By June 2017, Shanghai Pudong airport recorded 62.7% punctuality rate, which was a 15% increase compared to the same period the previous year.

References

External links
 VariFlight Live Air Traffic

Civil aviation in China
Companies based in Hefei
Online companies of China
Aviation websites
Chinese companies established in 2005
Internet properties established in 2005
Flight tracking software